Tom Vanhoudt (born 28 July 1972, in Diest, Flemish Brabant), is a former professional tennis player from Belgium.

Vanhoudt achieved a career-high doubles ranking of World No. 36 in 2001. He participated in 9 Davis Cup ties for Belgium from 1991 to 2002, posting a 4–5 record in doubles.

ATP career finals

Doubles: 1 (1 title)

ATP Challenger and ITF Futures finals

Doubles: 39 (28–11)

Performance timelines

Doubles

Mixed doubles

External links
 
 
 

1972 births
Living people
People from Diest
Belgian male tennis players
Sportspeople from Flemish Brabant